Selma Kaderman Dritz (June 29, 1917 – September 3, 2008) was an American physician and epidemiologist who worked in San Francisco, California, where she began tracking the first known cases of Acquired Immune Deficiency Syndrome (AIDS) in the early 1980s.

Early life  
Selma Dritz was born in Chicago, Illinois, on June 29, 1917. Dritz loved music, and began her career as a concert pianist, before deciding that she ultimately wanted to help others through her role in the medical field.

Dritz studied medicine at the University of Illinois, and earned a medical degree (MD) in pediatrics. She then went on to obtain a master's of public health degree (MPH) at University of California, Berkeley School of Public Health in 1967, to complement her medical degree.

Career
In 1968, she was hired by the City of San Francisco as assistant director of the Health Department's Bureau of Communicable Disease Control. She worked and followed general public health concerns of the community, such as food poisoning and influenza. Thirteen years later, along with Erwin Braff, the director of the bureau, Dritz took note of a rare form of pneumonia and a rare form of cancer, Kaposi's sarcoma, both of which were afflicting gay men, and had, up to this point, only affected elderly Mediterranean men. She relayed the information to the Center for Disease Control in Atlanta. This data along with that of others was to become the first AIDS epidemic. HIV/AIDS lowers the immune system of the affected person, making them an easier target for viruses and other sicknesses, like the pneumonia and the cancer. She began to establish the etiology and epidemiology of what would be termed Acquired Immune Deficiency Syndrome, more commonly known by its acronym, AIDS.

Dritz played an instrumental role in tracking the newly found disease, HIV. Her no-nonsense approach to epidemiology moved mountains and paved the road to the treatment of human immunodeficiency virus (HIV). In short, Selma Dritz saved countless lives and her work still continues to today because of all of the research she did and recorded and the information that she gave.

Dritz wrote an article for the New England Journal of Medicine called "Medical Aspects of Homosexuality" in 1980. In this journal article, it explains some of the main medical and societal situations that have allowed to disease to be spread so quickly, one of these being the public bath houses that she had shut down, due to the fast spread of the disease.

Paul Volberding, former president of the International AIDS Society who helped found the first AIDS clinic at San Francisco General Hospital in the 1980s said of Dritz: She was an absolutely wonderful person, and played an incredibly important role during those early days of the epidemic... Dr. Dritz was the most important person to whom the Centers for Disease Control came for the details of the AIDS situation here, and the information she gathered was invaluable for the CDC epidemiologists in understanding how the epidemic was spreading. Dr. Dritz had a great impact in her career involving AIDS. After she pioneered the discovery of the disease, many came to her for advice and answers. In her San Francisco community, she was known as someone who looked at an epidemic and didn't back down. She continued on to educate all people about the risks of the disease, not only people in the gay or LGBTQ community. While her focus was on this community for most of her career, the effort and research she put into learning about this disease helped and continues to help all those affected by this horrible disease.

AIDS 
In Dritz's days, AIDS was often coined "Gay Plague" or "Gay Cancer". She rejected these terms, emphasizing the official term of "Acquired Immune Deficiency Syndrome". Her children always made fun of her and teased her, calling her "den mother of the gays". While she made some unpopular decisions, like shutting down public bath houses for a time, she knew minimizing risk would reduce deaths.

Dr. Dritz was featured in And The Band Played On, a 1987 book by Randy Shilts about the early days of the disease. Dritz's work was featured in the film adaptation of And The Band Played On, where she was portrayed by Lily Tomlin. In the movie she was referred to as "Attila the Hun" for her role in the prevention of spread of AIDS.

Personal life
Dritz married Dr. H. Fred Dritz in 1943 and had three children: Ronald, Deborah, and Ariel. Her marriage ended in divorce in 1973.

Death
She died in 2008, aged 91, at the Claremont House Retirement Center in Oakland, California.

Since the death of Dritz, she has been featured throughout the study of the history of AIDS. A look into the life of Dritz is possible through the Selma Dritz Papers. The collection features pictures, correspondence, research, and other materials. These papers have allowed her work to continue into today and help not only those in the LGBTQ community but all those affected by HIV/AIDS.

References

External links
www.bmj.com
Face of Aids website

1917 births
2008 deaths
American medical researchers
American public health doctors
Physicians from Chicago
Scientists from the San Francisco Bay Area
UC Berkeley School of Public Health alumni
University of Illinois alumni
20th-century American women physicians
20th-century American physicians
History of HIV/AIDS
Women epidemiologists
21st-century American women
Women public health doctors